The Smith & Wesson Model 625, is a six-round, double-action revolver chambered for the .45 ACP using moon clips. The Model 625 is an improved stainless steel version Smith & Wesson Model 22 and a direct descendant of the Smith & Wesson M1917 revolver first issued during World War I.

Design
Based on S&W's stainless steel N frame (large) revolver, the Model 625 was introduced as the .45 CAL MODEL OF 1988, in 1988 as a limited edition model intended as an International Practical Shooting Confederation (IPSC) commemorative. It was equipped with a 5-inch (127 mm) barrel with a full-length underlug. The regular production model of the Model 625 was introduced in 1989. it was also made with 3-inch and 4-inch barrels. Standard offerings now only include the 4-inch and 5-inch barrel.

The S&W Model 625 Mountain Gun is a lightweight version of the 625, with a shortened underlug and tapered barrel, and "Mountain Gun" etched on one side of the barrel. The standard Model 625 Mountain Gun fires .45 Colt through a 4-inch (102 mm) barrel. In 2001, a limited edition was also built by the Smith & Wesson Performance Center that uses .45 ACP ammunition. Both of these revolvers have adjustable rear sights and Hogue rubber grips.

The Model 625-10 is the newest version of this revolver from the Smith & Wesson Performance Center, introduced in 2004. It is a snubnosed revolver version of the 625. The S&W Model 625-10 is a stainless steel update of the M1917 revolver, a popular starting gun for conversion to a "Fitz Special".

Another recent Performance Center version, the S&W Model 625 JM, was introduced in 2005. The "JM" stands for Jerry Miculek, a renowned revolver speed shooter, and is his personal design. The Model 625 JM uses a 4-inch (102 mm) barrel with rear adjustable sights and a front gold bead black patridge sight. The Model 625 JM is finished in matte bead-blasted stainless steel. The grips are Miculek's design.

Another .45 ACP revolver from Smith & Wesson is the Model 325 Night Guard.  It is similar to the 625-10 in that the frame is an aluminum-scandium blend.  It has a similar grooved rear sight as the 625-10, but the front sight of the 325 Night Guard is a tritium night sight.  The model 325 has a matte black finish. The Model 325 Night Guard has been discontinued.

An additional Smith & Wesson .45 ACP revolver is the Model 325 Thunder Ranch, which has a 4 inch barrel and a accessory rail for mounting lights and lasers.

The Model 625 in .45 ACP was the revolver used by Jerry Miculek on September 11, 1999, when he set the world record for the fastest six shots, a reload, and another six shots in 2.99 seconds.

Use of moon clips 

The Model 625 was designed to fire .45 ACP pistol cartridges with use with moon clips. It will head-space the .45 ACP cartridge in the chambers without use of moon clips, but since the extractor cannot engage the rimless cartridge, the empty shells must be ejected with a cleaning rod or pencil. It may also use .45 Auto Rim as they were designed for revolvers chambered in .45 ACP using moon clips. The Model 625 may also fire the newer .45 GAP cartridge, but only with the use of moon clips.

Variants of the 625
 S&W Model 625 (.45 Long Colt Target Stainless)
 S&W Model 625 Mountain Gun (Model of 1989 .45 Light Weight 39.5 oz (1.1 kg))
 S&W Model 625-2 .45 ACP
 S&W Model 625-3 .45 Long Colt
 S&W Model 625-4 .45 ACP
 S&W Model 625-5 .45 Long Colt
 S&W Model 625-6 and -9 Mountain Gun (-6: .45 ACP, -9: .45 Long Colt)
 S&W Model 625-7 .45 Long Colt
 S&W Model 625-8 .45 ACP
 S&W Model 625-9 .45 Long Colt
 S&W Model 625-10 (.45 ACP Target Stainless)
 S&W Model 625-11 .45 Long Colt Scandium Frame Performance Center
 S&W Model 625 JM (Jerry Miculek design)
 S&W Model 625-6 V-Comp .45 ACP (Performance Center)

Gallery

References

External links
 Smith & Wesson Inc.
 Smith & Wesson's 625-2 .45 Auto Rim, by John Taffin

.45 ACP revolvers
.45 GAP firearms
.45 Colt firearms
Revolvers of the United States
Smith & Wesson revolvers